Margaret Joan Chalmers,  (May 30, 1928 – December 2, 2016) was a Canadian philanthropist and supporter of the arts.

Born in Toronto, Ontario, she and her parents, Floyd and Jean Chalmers, founded the annual Chalmers Awards in 1972, which donates $25,000 CAD to artists in dance, theatre, crafts, film, the visual arts and music.

She was involved with the travelling exhibit, Survivors in Search of a Voice: The Art of Courage, which as a collaboration among 24 prominent Canadian women artists and over 100 breast cancer  survivors.

While celebrating her 70th birthday in 1998, she announced that she would provide 20 arts groups with a total of $1 million in funding.

Chalmers was the partner of former singer-songwriter Barbra Amesbury.

She died on December 2, 2016 in Toronto, from injuries suffered in a fall.

Honours
 In 1985 Ms Chalmers received the Diplôme d'Honneur from the Canadian Conference of the Arts
 In 1987 she was made a Member of the Order of Canada.
 In 1987 she was awarded a Doctor of Fine Arts, honoris causa from NSCAD University.
 In 1992 she was promoted to Officer of the Order of Canada.
 In 1993 she received the Ramon John Hnatyshyn (RJH) Award for Voluntarism in the Performing Arts.
 In 1994 she was awarded the Order of Ontario.
 In 1994 she was awarded an honorary Doctor of Law from the University of Waterloo.
 In 1997 she was promoted to Companion of the Order of Canada.
 In 2001 she received the Governor General's Award for Visual and Media Arts in the Outstanding Contribution category.

References

1928 births
2016 deaths
Canadian women philanthropists
Canadian philanthropists
Companions of the Order of Canada
Governor General's Award in Visual and Media Arts winners
20th-century Canadian LGBT people
Members of the Order of Ontario
People from Toronto
20th-century Canadian philanthropists
20th-century women philanthropists